Megasurcula wynoocheensis is an extinct species of sea snail, a marine gastropod mollusk in the family Pseudomelatomidae, the turrids and allies. The name originates from the Wynoochee Valley of Washington state.

Description
The length of the shell attains 43 mm, its diameter 21.4 mm.

This is a slender, high-spired turrid with a strongly concave whorl profile and sutures riding high upon the vertical segment of the preceding whorls.

Distribution
Fossils of this marine species have been found in Miocene strata in the Pacific Northwest in the United States. The type locality was a logging road west of Montesano, Washington. It has also been found in Oregon and California.

References

External links
 Paleobio database: Megasurcula wynoocheensis

wynoocheensis
Gastropods described in 1912